Majid Motalebi (Persian: مجید مطلبی, born 24 May 1979) is an Iranian producer and executive producer. He has started his professional work in 1999 in theatre with Yek Maz'hakeh by Reza Karamrezaei as a stage manager. He worked with the same director in another theatre as an assistant. In 2000 he established STUDIO MIX, a dubbing and sound studio. In 2004 as a production manager and producer substitute, he went back to theatre. This time in A Man, A Woman by Azita Hajian. In 2008 he produced a short film The Elevator and in 2009 a long film The Pothole by Ali Karim. In 2011 as executive producer, he was in A Simple Love Story by Saman Moghadam and in 2012 as producer consultant in I Hate The Dawn a long film by Ali Karim. Sperm Whale is a long film by Saman Moghadam 2014, he was its executive producer.

Filmography

References

Imdb
Majid Motalebi at Sekans
IranianMovieDataBase
 “The Warden” named Iran’s best film of the year 

Iranian film producers
1979 births
Living people
People from Tehran